Bruna Erhardt Motta (born January 1, 1988) is a Brazilian model.

Career 
She has appeared on the cover of the Brazilian Vogue. Fellow Brazilian models Caroline Trentini and Cintia Dicker are her good friends and roommates in New York City. Erhardt has signed with major agencies such as Marilyn São Paulo and New York City, Select Model Management London, Women Milan, and Colors Modeling Agency Barcelona.

Personal life
Bruna was born in Tubarão, Santa Catarina. She is of German descent.

References

External links

1988 births
Living people
People from Tubarão
Brazilian people of German descent
Brazilian female models